The 1985–86 IHF Women's Cup Winners' Cup was the tenth edition of IHF's competition for European women's handball national cup champions. 20 teams entered the competition, three less than in the previous edition.

3-times European Cup champion Radnički Belgrade defeated VfL Engelskirchen in its sixth consecutive appearance in a European final, to win the first of its three Cup Winners' Cups to date. It was the last of 5 consecutive trophies won by Yugoslav teams, a competition record which hasn't been matched as of 2013. On the other hand, Engelskirchen was the first club from the Western Bloc to reach the competition's final.

Results

References

Women's EHF Cup Winners' Cup
1985 in handball
1986 in handball